José Agüero may refer to:

 José Agüero (Brazilian tennis) (born 1933), Brazilian tennis player of the 1950s.
 José Agüero (Cuban tennis), Cuban tennis player of the 1940s.
 José Agüero (footballer), Spanish footballer for Athletic Club de Madrid and Racing de Santander.